Scotiophryne is an extinct genus of prehistoric amphibian.

See also 
 Prehistoric amphibian
 List of prehistoric amphibians

References 

Prehistoric frogs
Prehistoric amphibians of North America
Early Cretaceous frogs
Late Cretaceous amphibians
Cretaceous United States
Hell Creek fauna
Cretaceous–Paleogene boundary
Fossil taxa described in 1969